(born June 22, 1971 in Gifu) is a retired Olympic backstroke swimmer from Japan. He represented his native country at two consecutive Summer Olympics, starting in 1992. He is best known for winning a silver medal at the 1995 Summer Universiade in Fukuoka. He competed for the Waseda University.

References
 

1971 births
Living people
Japanese male butterfly swimmers
Olympic swimmers of Japan
Swimmers at the 1992 Summer Olympics
Swimmers at the 1996 Summer Olympics
Sportspeople from Gifu Prefecture
Asian Games medalists in swimming
Swimmers at the 1990 Asian Games
Swimmers at the 1994 Asian Games
Asian Games gold medalists for Japan
Asian Games silver medalists for Japan
Asian Games bronze medalists for Japan
Japanese male backstroke swimmers
Medalists at the 1990 Asian Games
Medalists at the 1994 Asian Games
Universiade medalists in swimming
Universiade silver medalists for Japan
Medalists at the 1995 Summer Universiade
20th-century Japanese people